| population_urban             = 334,112
| population_density_urban_km2 = 1211.0
| population_rank              = 
| demographics_type1           = 
| demographics1_footnotes      = 
| demographics1_title1         = 
| demographics1_info1          = 
| demographics1_title2         = 
| demographics1_info2          = 
| demographics1_title3         = 
| demographics1_info3          = 
| demographics1_title4         = 
| demographics1_info4          = 
| demographics_type2           = 
| demographics2_footnotes      = 
| demographics2_title1         = 
| demographics2_info1          = 
| demographics2_title2         = 
| demographics2_info2          = 
| demographics2_title3         = 
| demographics2_info3          = 
| blank_name                   = 
| blank_info                   = 
| timezone                     = EET
| utc_offset                   = +02:00
| timezone_DST                 = EEST
| utc_offset_DST               = +03:00
| website                      = 
}}

Tampere is a city in the Pirkanmaa region, located in the western part of Finland. Tampere is the most populous inland city in the Nordic countries. Tampere is the second-largest urban area and third most-populous individual municipality in Finland, after the cities of Helsinki and Espoo, and the most populous Finnish city outside the Greater Helsinki area. Today, Tampere is one of the major urban, economic, and cultural hubs in the whole inland region.

Tampere and its environs belong to the historical province of Satakunta. The area belonged to the Häme Province from 1831 to 1997, and over time it has often been considered to belong to Tavastia as a province. For example, in Uusi tietosanakirja published in the 1960s, the Tampere sub-region is presented as part of the then Tavastia Province. Around the 1950s, Tampere and its surroundings began to establish itself as their own province of Pirkanmaa. Tampere became the center of Pirkanmaa, and in the early days of the province, Tammermaa was also used several times in its early days - for example, in the Suomi-käsikirja published in 1968. Tampere is wedged between two lakes, Näsijärvi and Pyhäjärvi. Tampere is dubbed the "Manchester of the North" for its past as the center of Finnish industry, and this has given rise to its Finnish nickname "Manse" and terms such as "Manserock". Tampere has also been officially declared the "Sauna Capital of the World", because it has the most public saunas globally.

The distance to Turku is roughly the same. Tampere–Pirkkala Airport is Finland's eighth-busiest airport, with over 230,000 passengers in 2017. Tampere also serves as an important transit route for three Finnish highways: Highway 3 (E12), Highway 9 (E63) and Highway 12.

Tampere ranked 26th in the list of 446 cities in the world's hipster cities, and it has often been rated as the most popular city in Finland. The positive development of Tampere and the Tampere metropolitan area has continued throughout the 21st century, which is largely due to Tampere being one of the most migratory and attractive cities in Finland.

Etymology 

Although the name Tampere is derived from the Tammerkoski rapids (both the city and the rapids are called Tammerfors in Swedish), the origin of the Tammer- part of that name has been the subject of much debate. Ánte accepts the "straightforward" etymology of Rahkonen and Heikkilä in Proto-Samic ,  meaning "deep, slow section of a stream" and  "rapids" (cognate with the Finnish koski). This has become the most accepted explanation in the academia, according to the Institute for the Languages of Finland. Other theories include that it comes from the Swedish word damber, meaning milldam; another, that it originates from the ancient Scandinavian words þambr ("thick bellied") and þambion ("swollen belly"), possibly referring to the shape of the rapids. Another suggestion links the name to the Swedish word Kvatemberdagar, or more colloquially Tamperdagar, meaning the Ember days of the Western Christian liturgical calendar. The Finnish word for oak, tammi, also features in the speculation, although Tampere is situated outside the natural distribution range of the European oak.

Heraldry 

The first coat of arms of Tampere was designed by Arvid von Cederwald in 1838, while the current coat of arms created in 1960 and currently in use was designed by Olof Eriksson. Changing the coat of arms was a controversial act and the restoration of the old coat of arms has, from time to time, been demanded even after the change. The new coat of arms has also been called Soviet-style in letters to the editor because of its colors.

The blazon of the old coat of arms has either not survived or it has never been done, but the description of the current coat of arms is explained as follows: "In the red field, a corrugated counter-bar, above which is accompanied by a piled hammer, and below, a Caduceus; all gold". The colors of the coat of arms are the same as in the coat of arms of Pirkanmaa. The hammer, which looks like the first letter of the city's name T, symbolizes Tampere's early industry, Caduceus its trading activities and the corrugated counter-bar represents the Tammerkoski rapids, which divides Tampere's industrial and commercial areas.

The city received its first seal in 1803, and the seal depicted the city's buildings of that time and Tammerkoski.

History

Early history 

The earliest known permanent settlements around Tammerkoski were established in 7th century, when settlers from the west of the region started farming land in Takahuhti. The area was largely inhabited by the Tavastian tribes. For many centuries, the population remained low. By the 16th century, the villages of Messukylä and Takahuhti had grown to be the largest settlements in the region. Other villages nearby were Laiskola, Pyynikkälä and Hatanpää. At that time, there had been a market place in the Pispala area for centuries, where the bourgeoisies from Turku in particular traded. In 1638, Governor-General Per Brahe the Younger ordered that two markets be held in Tammerkoski each year, the autumn market on every Peter's Day in August and the winter market on Mati Day in February. In 1708 the market was moved from the edge of Tammerkoski to Harju and from there in 1758 to Pispala. The early industries in the Pirkanmaa region in the 17th century were mainly watermills and sawmills, while in the 18th century other production began to emerge, as several small-scale ironworks, Tammerkoski distillery and Otavala spinning school were founded.

Founding and industrialization 

Before the founding of the city of Tampere, its neighboring municipality of Pirkkala (according to which the current Pirkanmaa region got its name) was the most administratively significant parish in the area throughout the Middle Ages. This all changed in the 18th century when Erik Edner, a Finnish pastor, proposed the establishment of a city of Tampere on the banks of the Tammerkoski channel in 1771–1772; it was officially founded as a market place in 1775 by Gustav III of Sweden and four years later, 1 October 1779, Tampere was granted full city rights. At this time, it was a rather small town, founded on the lands belonging to Tammerkoski manor, while its inhabitants were still mainly farmers. As farming on the city's premises was forbidden, the inhabitants began to rely on other methods of securing a livelihood, primarily trade and handicraft. When Finland became part of the Russian Empire as the Grand Duchy of Finland in 1809, Tampere still had less than a thousand inhabitants.

Tampere grew as a major market town and industrial centre in the 19th century; the industrialization of Tampere was greatly influenced by the Finlayson textile factory, founded in 1820 by the Scottish industrialist James Finlayson. By the year 1850, the factory employed around 2000 people, while the population of the city had increased to 4000 inhabitants. Other notable industrial establishments that followed Finlayson's success in the 1800s were the Tampella blast furnace, machine factory and flax mill, the Frenckell paper mill, and the Tampere broadcloth factory. Tampere's population grew rapidly at the end of the 19th century, from about 7,000 in 1870 to 36,000 in 1900. At the beginning of the 20th century, Tampere was a city of workers and women, with a third of the population being factory workers and more than half women. At the same time, the city's area increased almost sevenfold and impressive apartment buildings were built in the center of Tampere among modest wooden houses. The stone houses shaped Tampere in a modern direction. The construction of the sewerage and water supply network and the establishment of electric lighting were further steps towards modernisation; regarding the latter, Tampere was the first Nordic city to introduce electric lights for general use in 1882. The railway connection to Tampere from the extension of the Helsinki–Hämeenlinna line section (today part of the Main Line) via Toijala was opened to public traffic on 22 June 1876.

The world-famous Nokia Corporation, a multinational telecommunication company, also had its beginnings in the Tammerkoski area; the company's history dates from 1865, when the Finnish-Swedish mining engineer Fredrik Idestam (1838–1916) established a pulp mill on the shores of the rapids and after that, a second pulp mill was opened in 1868 near the neighboring town of Nokia, where there were better hydropower resources.

Geopolitical significance 

Tampere was the centre of many important political events in the early 20th century; for example, the 1905 conference of the Russian Social Democratic Labour Party (RSDLP), led by Vladimir Lenin, was held at the Tampere Workers' Hall, where it was decided, among other things, to launch an armed uprising, which eventually led to the October 1917 revolution in the Russian Empire. Also, on 1 November 1905, during the general strike, the famous Red Declaration was proclaimed on Keskustori. In 1918, after Finland had gained independence, Tampere played a major role, being one of the strategically important sites for the Finnish Socialist Workers' Republic (FSWR) during the Civil War in Finland (28 January–15 May 1918); the city was the most important industrial city in Finland at the beginning of the 20th century, marked by a huge working population. Tampere was a Red stronghold during the war, with Hugo Salmela in command. White forces, led by General Mannerheim, captured the town after the Battle of Tampere, seizing about 10,000 Red prisoners on 6 April 1918.

During the Winter War, Tampere was bombed by the Soviet Union several times. The reason for the bombing of Tampere was that the city was an important railway junction, and also housed the State Aircraft Factory and the Tampella factory, which manufactured munitions and weapons, including grenade launchers. The most devastating bombings were on 2 March 1940, killing nine and wounding 30 city residents. In addition, ten buildings were destroyed and 30 were damaged that day.

Post-war period and modern day 

Prevalent in Tampere's post-World War II municipal politics was the Brothers-in-Arms Axis (aseveliakseli), which mostly consisted of the National Coalition Party and the Social Democrats. While the Centre Party was the largest political force in the Finnish countryside, it had no practical relevance in Tampere.

After World War II, Tampere was enlarged by joining some neighbouring areas. Messukylä was incorporated in 1947, Lielahti in 1950, Aitolahti in 1966 and finally Teisko in 1972. The limit of 100,000 inhabitants was crossed in Tampere in 1950. Tampere was long known for its textile and metal industries, but these have been largely replaced by information technology and telecommunications during the 1990s. The technology centre Hermia in Hervanta is home to many companies in these fields. Yleisradio started broadcasting its second television channel, Yle TV2, in Ristimäki, Tampere in 1965, as a result of which Finland was the first of the Nordic countries to receive a second television channel, after Sweden's SVT2 started broadcasting only four years later. Tampere became a university city when the Social University moved from Helsinki to Tampere in 1960 and became the University of Tampere in 1966. In 1979, Tampere-Pirkkala Airport was opened  from the center of Tampere on the side of the Pirkkala municipality.

At the turn of the 1990s, Tampere's industry underwent a major structural change, as the production of Tampella's and Tampere's textile industry in particular was heavily focused on bilateral trade with the Soviet Union, but when it collapsed in 1991 the companies lost their main customers. As a result of the sudden change and the depression of the early 1990s, Finlayson and the Suomen trikoo had to reduce their operations sharply. Tampella went bankrupt. But although the change left a huge amount of vacant industrial space in the city center, in the early 2000s it was gradually put to other uses, with the current Tampere cityscape being characterized above all by strong IT companies, most notably Nokia's Tampere R&D units.

Geography 

Tampere is part of the Pirkanmaa region and is surrounded by the municipalities of Kangasala, Lempäälä, Nokia, Orivesi, Pirkkala, Ruovesi, and Ylöjärvi. There are 180 lakes that are larger than 10,000 m2 (1 ha) in Tampere, and fresh water bodies make up 24% of the city's total area. The lakes have formed as separate basins from Ancylus lake approximately 7500–8000 years ago. The northernmost point of Tampere is located in the Vankavesi fjard of Teisko, the southernmost at the eastern end of Lake Hervanta, the easternmost at the northeast corner of Lake Paalijärvi of Teisko and the westernmost at the southeast corner of Lake Haukijärvi near the borders of Ylöjärvi and Nokia. The city center itself is surrounded by three lakes, Näsijärvi, Pyhäjärvi and much smaller Iidesjärvi. Tampere region is situated in the Kokemäki River drainage basin, which discharges into the Bothnian Sea through river which flows through Pori, the capital of Satakunta region. The bedrock of Tampere consists of mica shale and migmatite, and its building stone deposits are diverse: in addition to traditional granite, there is an abundance of quartz diorite, tonalite, mica shale and mica gneiss. One of the most notable geographical features in Tampere is the Pyynikki Ridge (Pyynikinharju), a large esker formed from moraine during the Weichselian glaciation. It rises 160 meters above sea level and is said to be the largest gravel esker in the world. It is also part of Salpausselkä, a 200 km long ridge system left by the ice age.

The center of Tampere (Keskusta), as well as the Pyynikki, Ylä-Pispala and Ala-Pispala districts, are located on the isthmus between Lake Pyhäjärvi and Lake Näsijärvi. The location of the city on the edge of the Tammerkoski rapids between two long waterways was one of the most important stimuli for its establishment in the 1770s. The streets of central Tampere form a typical grid pattern. On the western edge of the city center, there is a north–south park street, Hämeenpuisto ("Häme Park" or "Tavastia Park"), which leads from the shore of Lake Pyhäjärvi near Lake Näsijärvi. The wide Hämeenkatu street leads east–west from the Tampere Central Station to Hämeenpuisto and crosses Tammerkoski along the Hämeensilta bridge. Also along Hämeenkatu is the longest street in the city center, Satakunnankatu, which extends from Rautatienkatu to Amuri, which crosses Tammerkoski along the Satakunnansilta bridge. The Tampere Central Square is located on the western shore of Tammerkoski, close to Hämeensilta. The traffic center of Tampere is the intersection of Itsenäisyydenkatu, Teiskontie, Sammonkatu, Kalevanpuisto park street, and Kaleva and Liisankallio districts.

Neighbourhoods and other subdivisions 

The city of Tampere is divided into seven subdivisions, each of which includes the many districts and their suburbs. There are a total of 111 statistical areas in Tampere. However, the statistical areas made for Tampere's statistics do not fully correspond to the Tampere district division or the residents' perception of the districts, as the Amuri, Kyttälä and Tammela districts, for example, are divided into two parts corresponding to the official district division, and in addition to this, Liisankallio and Kalevanrinne are often considered to belong to the Kaleva district.

Climate 

Tampere has a subarctic climate (Köppen climate classification Dfc) bordering  the humid continental climate Dfb climate zone.  Winters are cold and the average temperature from December to February is below . Summers are cool to warm. On average, snow cover lasts 4–5 months from late November to early April. Considering it being close to the subarctic threshold and inland, winters are, on average, quite mild for the classification, as is the annual mean temperature.

Temperature records of Tampere 

Temperature records of Tampere and the near-by Tampere–Pirkkala Airport:

Temperature Records of Tampere

Highest temperatures at the Tampere–Pirkkala Airport by month since 1980:

Lowest temperatures in Tampere:

Lowest temperatures at the Tampere–Pirkkala Airport by month since 1980:

Cityscape

Revival and nationalism 

Tampere has buildings from many architectural periods. Only the old stone church of Messukylä represents medieval building culture. Early 19th century neoclassicism, in turn, is represented by the Tampere Old Church and its belfry. The Gothic Revival buildings in Tampere that emerged from neoclassicism are the new Messukylä Church and the Alexander Church, and the Renaissance Revival buildings are the Hatanpää Manor, the Tampere City Hall, the Ruuskanen House and Näsilinna. The romantic nationalism design can be seen in the Commerce House, the Tirkkonen House, the Palander House, the Tampere Cathedral, the Tampere Central Fire Station and the National Bank Building in Tampere. At an early stage, the use of red brick as a material in the industrial buildings along Tammerkoski, such as the Finlayson and Tampella factories, has left a strong imaginary mark on the city.

Functionalism and modernism 

Post-Art Nouveau classicism was largely Nordic, during which the Laikku Culture House, Hotel Tammer, the Tuulensuu House and the Viinikka Church were built in Tampere. After functionalism became the prevailing style in the 1930s, the Tampere Central Station, the Tempo House, a bus station and the Kauppi Hospital were built in Tampere. There is no single accepted designation for the post-war style, but the key representatives of the reconstruction period are the Bank of Finland House, the Amurinlinna House and the Pyynikki Swimming Hall. The rationalist buildings of the modernist period are represented by the University of Tampere, the Tampere Central Hospital, Sampola, the School of Economics, Ratina Stadium and the Kaleva Church. After this, diverse modernism will be represented by, among others, the Metso Main Library, the Hervanta Operations Center, the Tampere Hall, the university extension and Nokia's office building in Hatanpää.

The city center of Tampere and also its western parts have been developed in a more modern direction since the 2010s, and the city aims to get the center to take on its future form by the 2030s. Plans have been drawn up for the Central Station area in particular in the form of the "Tampere Deck" project, in connection with which a new multi-purpose arena and high-rise buildings have been sent to the area. A light rail network has also been recently built in the downtown area. Artificial island projects are planned on the shores of the lakes, which would create new residential areas for several thousand inhabitants. The projects are estimated to cost several billion euros.

Economy 

The Tampere region, Pirkanmaa, which includes outlying municipalities, has around 509,000 residents, 244,000 employed people, and a turnover of 28 billion euros .

According to the Tampere International Business Office, the area is strong in mechanical engineering and automation, information and communication technologies, and health and biotechnology, as well as pulp and paper industry education. Unemployment rate was 15.7% in August 2020. 70% of the areas jobs are in the service sector. Less than 20% are in the manufacturing sector. 34.5% of employed people live outside the Tampere municipality and commute to Tampere for work. Meanwhile, 15.6% of Tampere's residents work outside Tampere. In 2014 the largest employers were Kesko, Pirkanmaan Osuuskauppa, Alma Media and Posti Group.

According to a study carried out by the Synergos Research and Training Center of the University of Tampere, the total impact of tourism in the Tampere region in 2012 was more than 909 million euros. Tourism also brought 4,805 person-years to the region. The biggest single attraction in Tampere is the Särkänniemi amusement park, which had about 630,000 visitors in 2016. In addition, in 2015, 1,021,151 overnight stays were made in Tampere hotels. The number exceeded the previous record year with more than 20,000 overnight stays. All that makes Tampere the second most popular city in Finland after Helsinki in terms of hotel stays. Leisure tourism accounted for 55,4% of overnight stays and occupational tourism for 43,2%. The occupancy rate of all accommodation establishments with more than 20 rooms was 57,0%, while that of accommodation establishments in the whole country was 48,3%.

Tampere's economic profit in 2015 was the worst of big Finnish cities. In 2016 the loss of the fiscal year was 18,8 million euros. In the city's economy, the largest revenues come from taxes and government contributions. In 2015, the city received 761 million euros in municipal tax revenue. In addition, 61,4 million euros came from corporate taxes and 64 million euros from property taxes. Tax revenues have not increased as expected in the 2010s, although the city's population has increased. This has been affected by high unemployment.

Tampere is headquarters for Bronto Skylift, an aerial rescue and aerial work platform manufacturer.

Energy 

In 2013, Tampereen Energiantuotanto, which is part of the Tampereen Sähkölaitos Group, generated 1,254 GWh of electricity and 2,184 GWh of district heating. The two units of the Naistenlahti's power plant generated a total of about 65% and the Lielahti's power plant about 30% of the electricity production. In district heating production, the Naistenlahti power plant units accounted for 57% and the Lielahti power plant for 23%. Tampere's ten heating centers accounted for 21%.

In 2013, the share of natural gas in energy production was about 65%. Wood and peat accounted for about 17%. In addition, hydropower and oil were used. Emissions from energy production have decreased in the 21st century due to the growth of renewable forms of production and the modernization of the Naistenlahti plant. In 2013, approximately 669,000 tonnes of carbon dioxide emissions and 297 tonnes of sulfur dioxide emissions were generated.

Water and waste management 

66,5% of Tampere's domestic water is surface water and 33,5% groundwater. 58% of the water was diverted to economic use and 13% to industrial use. In addition to Tampere, Tampereen Vesi manages water in Pirkkala. Almost all surface water comes from Lake Roine. In addition, Tampereen Vesi has four surface water plants in Lake Näsijärvi and five groundwater intakes. Tampereen Vesi is 96% responsible for the wastewater of Tampere, Kangasala, Pirkkala and Ylöjärvi. In 2012, a total of 31,9 million cubic meters of wastewater was treated in Tampere. The Viinikanlahti treatment plant treats more than 75% of wastewater.

Pirkanmaan Jätehuolto handles waste management in Tampere. It has waste treatment facilities in Nokia's Lake Koukkujärvi and Tampere's Lake Tarastenjärvi.

Demographics 

Tampere has 238,671 inhabitants, making it the third most populous municipality in Finland and the tenth in the Nordics. The Tampere region, which has 410,689 inhabitants, is the second largest urban area after Helsinki. 8.6% of the population has a foreign background, which is lower than Helsinki and Turku but higher than Oulu.

The demographic structure of Tampere shows the city's position as a very popular place to study, as the number of young adults is clearly higher than in other municipalities in the region. At the end of 2012, the population dependency ratio was 45. About 17,3% of the population was over 65 years of age. Just over half of the population is women, as in the whole country. The population is fairly educated, with two-thirds of those over 15 having completed post-primary education.

Tampere is Finland's largest monolingual Finnish-speaking municipality. In 2021, 1,321 Swedish-speakers lived in Tampere, ie their share of the Tampere population was about half a per cent. This is the second largest number of Swedish-speakers in monolingual Finnish-speaking municipalities after Kaarina. Kaarina and Tampere are also the only monolingual Finnish-speaking municipalities with a separate Swedish-speaking congregation. In 1900, Swedish-speakers accounted for more than six per cent of Tampere's population and in 1950 for less than two per cent. Speakers of languages other than Finnish or Swedish account for 8.5% of the population, similar to the national average of 8.3%. The most spoken languages among them are Russian (1.3%), Arabic (1.0%), Farsi (0.8%) and English (0.6%).

At the end of 2018, there were a total of 140,039 dwellings in Tampere, of which 127,639 were permanently inhabited and 12,400 were not permanently inhabited. Of these, 74% were apartment buildings, 14 detached houses, 10 terraced houses and 2% other residential buildings. Between 2002 and 2020, more than 40,000 new apartments have been completed in Tampere. Living space has been growing for a long time, although growth virtually came to a halt after 2008. The average living space at the end of 2012 was about 36,8 m2 per inhabitant, compared to about 19,2 m2 in 1970 and about 31,8 m2 in 1990. The average population of a dwelling in 2012 was about 1,8 inhabitants.

For more than ten years, Tampere has been one of the most migratory municipalities, as in January–September 2021, more than 1,930 new residents moved to Tampere. Nokia, Kangasala and Lempäälä, which are among Tampere's neighboring municipalities, have also been identified as the most migratory municipalities, which rose to the list of the 20 most attractive municipalities. Even during COVID-19 pandemic, Tampere has become Finland's most attractive area for internal migration, as Tampere gained the most migration gains in 2020.

Urban areas 

In 2019, out of the total population of 238,140, 231,648 people lived in urban areas and 3,132 in sparsely populated areas, while the coordinates of 3,360 people were unknown. This made Tampere's degree of urbanization 98.7%. The urban population in the municipality was divided between three statistical urban areas as follows:

Education 

The comprehensive education is given mainly in Finnish but the city has special bilingual groups where students study in Finnish and a second language (English, French or German). Furthermore, there is a private Swedish-speaking school in the Kaakinmaa district (Swedish Svenska samskolan i Tammerfors) that covers all levels of education from preschool to high school.

There are three institutions of higher education in the Tampere area totaling 40,000 students: the university and two polytechnic institutions. Tampere University (TUNI) has over 20,000 students and is located in two campuses, one in the Kalevanharju district, close to the city centre, and one in Hervanta, in the southern part of the city. The institution was formed in 2019 as a result of the merge of University of Tampere (UTA) and Tampere University of Technology (TUT). TUNI is also the major shareholder of the Tampere University of Applied Sciences (Tampereen ammattikorkeakoulu, TAMK), a polytechnic counting about 10,000 students. The Police University College, the polytechnic institution serving all of Finland in its field of specialization, is also located in Tampere.

Tampere University Hospital (Tampereen yliopistollinen sairaala, TAYS) in the Kauppi district, one of the main hospitals in Finland, is affiliated with Tampere University. It is a teaching hospital with 34 medical specializations.

The Nurmi district in the northern part of city also houses the Tampere Christian School (Tampereen kristillinen koulu), which operates on a co-Christian basis and is maintained by the Adventist Church of Finland, offering free basic education based on Christian basic values and outlook on life for all grades of primary school.

Arts and culture 

Tampere is known for its active cultural life. Some of the most popular writers in Finland, such as Väinö Linna, Kalle Päätalo, and Hannu Salama, hail from Tampere. These authors are known particularly as writers depicting the lives of working-class people, thanks to their respective backgrounds as members of the working class. Also from such a background was the poet Lauri Viita of the Pispala district, which was also the original home of the aforementioned Hannu Salama. On 1 October, Tampere celebrates the annual Tampere Day, which hosts a variety of public events.

Media 

Tampere is a strong media city, as the television center in Tohloppi and Ristimäki districts has had a nationwide Yle TV2 television channel since the 1970s, and Finnish radio, for example, began in Tampere when Arvi Hauvonen founded the first broadcasting station in 1923. Yle TV2 has its roots in Tamvisio, which was transferred to Yleisradio in 1964. Kakkoskanava ("Channel 2") has been a major influence in Tampere, and several well-known television programs and series have been shot in the city, such as TV comedies Tankki täyteen, Reinikainen and Kummeli. The Ruutu+ streaming service's popular crime drama television series Lakeside Murders, based on the Koskinen book series by Seppo Jokinen, is also produced and filmed in Tampere.

The Tampere Film Festival, an annual international short film event, is held every March. Tampere has also served as a filming location for international film productions, most notably the 1993 British comedy film The Big Freeze and the 2022 American sci-fi film Dual.

In 2014, Aamulehti, which was published in Tampere and was founded in 1881, was the third largest newspaper in Finland in terms of circulation, after Helsingin Sanomat and Ilta-Sanomat. The circulation of the magazine was 106,842 (2014). In addition, a free city newspaper Tamperelainen (literally translated "Tamperean", meaning person who live in Tampere) will be published in the city. In November 2016, the Tamperelainen was awarded the second best city newspaper in Finland.

The city is also known as the home of the popular Hydraulic Press Channel on YouTube, which originates from a machine shop owned by Lauri Vuohensilta.

Food 

A local food speciality is mustamakkara, which resembles the black pudding of northern England. It is a black sausage made by mixing pork, pig's blood and crushed rye and flour and is stuffed into the intestines of an animal. It is commonly eaten with lingonberry sauce. Especially Tammelantori square in the district of Tammela is known for its mustamakkara kiosks.

A newer Tampere tradition are munkki, fresh sugary doughnuts that are sold in several cafés around Tampere, but most traditionally in Pyynikki observation tower.

One of the specialties of Tampere's local barbecue dishes include the peremech based on traditional Tatar food. It is a pie reminiscent of Karelian pasty with seasoned ground meat inside.

In the 1980s, in addition to mustamakkara and barley bread, the old parish dish of Tampere was also called a potato soup, home-made small beer (kotikalja), a sweetened lingonberry porridge and a sweetened potato casserole (Imelletty perunalaatikko).

Since 1991, the two-day fish market event (Tampereen kalamarkkinat) in Laukontori attracts as many as 80,000–100,000 visitors in year, and is held both in the spring on vappu and in the autumn on Tampere Day.

Music 

Tampere is home to the Tampere Philharmonic Orchestra (Tampere Filharmonia), which is one of only two full-sized symphony orchestras in Finland; the other one is located in Helsinki. The orchestra's home venue is the Tampere Hall, and their concerts include classical, popular, and film music. Tampere Music Festivals organises three international music events: The Tampere Jazz Happening each November, and in alternate years The Tampere Vocal Music Festival and the Tampere Biennale. Professional education in many fields of classical music, including performing arts, pedagogic arts, and composition, is provided by Tampere University of Applied Sciences and Tampere Conservatoire.

Tammerfest, Tampere's urban rock festival, is held every July. The Blockfest, which also takes place in Tampere during the summer months, is the largest hip hop event in the Nordic countries. The Tampere Floral Festival is an annual event, held each Summer.

Manserock became a general term for rock music from Tampere, which was essentially rock music with Finnish lyrics. Manserock was especially popular during the 1970s and 1980s, and its most popular artists included Juice Leskinen, Virtanen, Kaseva, Popeda, and Eppu Normaali. In 1977, Poko Rekords, the first record company in Tampere, was founded.

In the 2010s, there has been a lot of popular musical activity in Tampere, particularly in the fields of rock and heavy/black metal; one of the most important metal music events in Tampere is the Sauna Open Air Metal Festival. Some of the most popular bands based in Tampere include Negative, Uniklubi, and Lovex. Tampere also has an active electronic music scene. Tampere hosts an annual World of Tango Festival (Maailmantango), which is one of the most significant tango events in Finland next to the Tangomarkkinat of Seinäjoki.

Theatre 

Tampere has a lengthy tradition of theater, with established institutions such as Tampereen Työväen Teatteri, Tampereen Teatteri, and Pyynikin Kesäteatteri, which is an open-air theatre with the oldest revolving auditorium in Europe. The longest-running directors of the Tampereen Teatteri include Eino Salmelainen and Rauli Lehtonen, and the Tampereen Työväen Teatteri has Kosti Elo, Eino Salmelainen and Lasse Pöysti. The Tampere Theatre Festival (Tampereen teatterikesä) is an international theatre festival held in the city each August. Tampere also has the Tampere Opera, founded in 1946.

Tampere's other professional theaters are Teatteri Siperia; restaurant theater Teatteripalatsi; Teatteri Telakka, known for its artistic experiments; Ahaa Teatteri, which specializes in children's and young people's plays; puppet theater Teatteri Mukamas, and Tanssiteatteri MD, specializes in contemporary dance performances. In addition, there are also three cinemas in Tampere: two Finnkino's theaters, Cine Atlas and Plevna, and private Arthouse Cinema Niagara, which serves as the main venue for the Cinemadrome Festival, which presents horror, action, sci-fi, trash, and other cult films. Local cinemas also included the historic Imatra, formerly located in the Kyttälä district, which was completely destroyed on a fire in the midst of a 1924 film Wages of Virtue on 23 October 1927, killing 21 people.

Religion 

As is the case with most of the rest of Finland, most Tampere citizens belong to the Evangelical Lutheran Church of Finland. One Lutheran church in Tampere is Finlayson Church in the district by the same name. Tampere also has a variety of other religious services spanning from traditional to charismatic. English services of the International Congregation of Christ the King (ICCK) are organized by the Anglican Church in Finland and the Lutheran Parishes of Tampere. The Catholic parish of the Holy Cross also offers services in Finnish, Polish and English. Other churches may also have English speaking ministries. Tampere is the center of a LDS stake (diocese). Other churches in Tampere are the Baptist Church, the Evangelical Free Church, the Evangelical Lutheran Mission Diocese of Finland, the Finnish Orthodox Church and the Nokia Revival.

There was an organized Jewish community until 1981. Though a small number of Jews remain in Tampere, organized communal life ended at that time.

There are three registered Muslim communities in Tampere. The biggest of them being Tampere Islam Society with over 1500 members.

City rivalry with Turku 

Tampere ostensibly has a long-standing mutual feud with the city of Turku, the first capital of Finland, and they tend to compete for the title of being the "second grand city of Finland" after Helsinki. This rivalry is largely expressed in jokes in one city about the other; prominent targets are the traditional Tampere food, mustamakkara, the state of the Aura River in Turku, and the regional accents. Tampere is well known as a food destination because of its food culture. Since 1997, students at Tampere have made annual excursions to Turku to jump on the market square, doing their part to undo the post-glacial rebound and push the city back into the Baltic Sea.

Main sights 

One of the main tourist attractions is the Särkänniemi amusement park, which includes the landmark Näsinneula tower, topped by a revolving restaurant. In addition to these, it used to house a dolphinarium. Other sites of interest are Tampere Cathedral, Tampere City Hall, Tampere Central Library Metso ("Capercaillie"), Kaleva Church (both designed by Reima Pietilä), the Tampere Hall (along Hämeenkatu) for conferences and concerts, the Tampere Market Hall and historical Pyynikki observation tower.

Tampere has at least seven hotels, the most noteworthy of which are Hotel Tammer, Hotel Ilves, and Hotel Torni, the tallest hotel building in Finland. The Holiday Club Tampere spa is also located in the Lapinniemi district on the shores of Lake Näsijärvi. There are also many significant shopping centers in the city center of Tampere and its suburbs; the most notable shopping centers are Ratina, Koskikeskus, DUO, Like, and Tullintori.

Tampere is also home to one of the last museums in the world dedicated to Vladimir Lenin. The museum is housed in the Tampere Workers' Hall (along Hallituskatu) where during a subsequent Bolshevik conference in the city, Lenin met Joseph Stalin for the first time. Lenin moved to Tampere in August 1905, but eventually fled for Sweden in November 1907 when being pursued by the Russian Okhrana. Lenin would not return to any part of the Russian Empire until ten years later, when he heard of the start of the Russian Revolution of 1917.

There are many museums and galleries, including:
 The Vapriikki Museum Centre which includes the Natural History Museum of Tampere, Finnish Hockey Hall of Fame, Finnish Museum of Games, Post Museum and the Shoe Museum
 Hatanpää Manor and Hatanpää Arboretum
 The Näsilinna Palace
 Tampere Art Museum
 Tampere Lenin Museum
 The Moomin Museum, about Moomins
 Rupriikki Media Museum
 Spy Museum in Siperia
 Workers' housing museum in Amuri.
 Finland's largest glass sculpture, owned by the City of Tampere, "Pack Ice / The Mirror of the Sea" by the renowned artist Timo Sarpaneva, was installed in the entrance lobby of the downtown shopping mall KoskiKeskus until it was moved to a warehouse.

Pispala 

Pispala is a ridge located between the two lakes. It is divided into Ylä-Pispala ("Upper Pispala") and Ala-Pispala ("Lower Pispala"). It was used to house the majority of industrial labour in the late 19th and early 20th century, when it was part of Suur-Pirkkala and its successor Pohjois-Pirkkala. It was a free area to be built upon by the working-class people working in Tampere factories. It joined Tampere in 1937. Currently it is a residential area undergoing significant redevelopment and together with neighbouring Pyynikki it forms an important historical area of Tampere.

Events

Sports 

Tampere's sporting scene is mainly driven by ice hockey. The first Finnish ice hockey match was played in Tampere, on the ice of Pyhäjärvi. Tampere is nicknamed the hometown of Finnish ice hockey. Three exceptional ice hockey teams come from Tampere: Tappara, Ilves and KOOVEE. Especially both Tappara and Ilves have had a great impact on Finnish ice hockey culture and are among the most successful teams in Finland; of these, Ilves was the first Tampere-based hockey team to win the 1935-1936 Finnish championship. The Finnish ice hockey museum, and the first ice hockey arena to be built in Finland, the Hakametsä arena, are both located in Tampere. Construction of a new main ice hockey arena, Tampere Deck Arena, began in 2018, and was first opened to the public on 3 December 2021, although the official opening date was on 15 December. The name of the new arena was supposed to be UROS LIVE, but due to the financial difficulties of the sponsor behind it, the name was abandoned. After that, Nokia Corporation was chosen as the new sponsor on 19 November 2021, and the arena was renamed as Nokia Arena. The arena served as the main venue for the 2022 IIHF World Championship.

Like ice hockey, association football is also a popular sport in Tampere. Ilves, the professional football club of Tampere, alone has over 4,000 players in its football teams, while Tampere boasts over 100 (mostly junior) football teams. Basketball is another popular sport in Tampere; the city has three basketball teams with big junior activity and one of them, Tampereen Pyrintö, plays on the highest level (Korisliiga) and was the Finnish Champion in 2010, 2011, and 2014.

Tampere Saints is the American football club in the city, that won division 2 in 2015 and plays in the Maple League (division 1) in summer 2017. Tampere has a baseball and softball club, the Tampere Tigers, which plays in the top division of Finnish baseball. In addition to all of the above, volleyball, wrestling and boxing are also among Tampere's best-known sports.

Tampere hosted some of the preliminaries for the 1952 Summer Olympics, the 1965 World Ice Hockey Championships and was co-host of the EuroBasket 1967. The city also hosted two canoe sprint world championships, in 1973 and 1983. In 1977, Tampere hosted the World Rowing Junior Championships and in 1995 the Senior World Rowing Championships. Recently, Tampere was the host of the 10th European Youth Olympic Festival on 17–25 July 2009 and the 2010 World Ringette Championships on 1–6 November at Hakametsä arena.

Tampere will host the 2023 European Masters Games from 26 June to 9 July.

Concerts 

Ratina Stadium of Tampere, in the district by the same name, has served as the venue for many of the most significant concerts, most notably in connection with the Endless Forms Most Beautiful World Tour in 2015 by the band Nightwish. Other noteworthy tours from other bands held at Ratina Stadium include Iron Maiden (Somewhere Back in Time World Tour, 2008), Bruce Springsteen (Working on a Dream Tour, 2009), AC/DC (Black Ice World Tour, 2010), Red Hot Chili Peppers (I'm with You World Tour, 2012), Bon Jovi (Because We Can World Tour, 2013), Robbie Williams (The Heavy Entertainment Show Tour, 2017) and Rammstein (Rammstein Stadium Tour, 2019).

Transport 

Tampere is an important railroad hub in Finland and there are direct railroad connections to, for example, Helsinki, Turku and the Port of Turku, Oulu, Jyväskylä, and Pori. Every day about 150 trains with an annual total of 8 million passengers arrive and depart in the Tampere Central Railway Station, which is located in the city center. There are also frequent bus connections to destinations around Finland. To the south of Tampere, there is the Tampere Ring Road, which is important for car traffic and which is part of Finnish highways number 3 (on the west side) and number 9 (on the east side). The main stretch of the ring road sees over 50,000 vehicles per day, and, according to the ELY Centre of Pirkanmaa, the western part of the ring road is the busiest road in Finland, if highway and ring road connections in the Helsinki metropolitan area are excluded. There are also plans for another ring road project that would run from Pirkkala to Tampere's Hervanta and possibly in the future to Kangasala. Teiskontie, which runs east of the city center, is part of Highway 12 in the direction of Lahti. This highway also runs through the center of Tampere under the name Paasikiven–Kekkosentie, below the downtown as the Tampere Tunnel, which is the longest road tunnel built in Finland for car traffic.

The current airport is connected to the city centre of Tampere by bus route 103, and to that of Pirkkala by bus route 39.

The public transport network in Tampere currently consists of a bus network and two lines of city's light rail, operating from 9 August 2021. The Tampere Bus Station, designed by Jaakko Laaksovirta and Bertel Strömmer, representing functionalist architecture, was completed in 1938, being the largest bus station in the Nordic countries at the time, and between 1948 and 1976, the city also had an extensive trolleybus network, which was also the largest trolleybus system in Finland. As of 2017, commuter rail service on the railroad lines connecting Tampere to the neighbouring towns of Nokia and Lempäälä is being established.

In 2015, the Port of Tampere, the charter port area carrying passengers on the shores of Lake Näsijärvi and Lake Pyhäjärvi, was the busiest inland waterway in Finland in terms of the number of passengers (71,750). A partial explanation for the high number of passengers can be found in the summer traffic to the Viikinsaari island in Lake Pyhäjärvi, where people travel for an excursion or various cultural events such as watching a summer theater. Domestic passenger and connecting vessel traffic was only busier in the Finnish sea area in the Helsinki Metropolitan Area, between mainland Finland and Åland in the Archipelago Sea.

In the 2010s, Tampere has made efforts to invest in the smooth running of cycling and walkability. Thanks to it, the city was awarded the title of "Cycling Municipality of the Year" in 2013. According to a survey conducted in 2015, the attractiveness of both cycling and walking had increased during 2014 and 2015. In any case, during the 21st century, the growth of bicycle traffic has been clearly faster than the growth of the city's population, and the number of cycles has increased by an average of about 2% per year.

Distances to other cities 

 Helsinki – 
 Hämeenlinna – 
 Joensuu – 
 Jyväskylä – 
 Kuopio – 
 Lahti – 
 Lappeenranta – 
 Oulu – 
 Pori – 
 Seinäjoki – 
 Turku – 
 Vaasa –

Government 

In 2007, Tampere switched to a new model of government. Since then, a mayor and four deputy mayors have been chosen for a period of four years by the city council. The mayor also becomes the seat of the city council for the duration of the tenure.

Tampere was the first Finnish municipality to be elected mayor. However, the mayor does not have an official relationship with the municipality; the mayor serves as chairman of the city board and directs the municipality's activities, and the mayor's duties are defined in the city government's bylaws. Because the mayor and deputy mayors are trustees, they can be removed by the council if they lose the majority trust.

For the first two years, Timo P. Nieminen, representing the National Coalition Party from 2007 to 2012, served as mayor. In 2013, Anna-Kaisa Ikonen of the same party was elected mayor. As of 1 June 2017, the number of deputy mayors decreased from four to three. Lauri Lyly (SDP) was elected Mayor of the City of Tampere for the period 2017–2021 at the City Council meeting on 12 June 2017.

Mayors over time 

 Kaarle Nordlund 1929–1943
 Sulo Typpö 1943–1957
 Erkki Lindfors 1957–1969
 Pekka Paavola 1969–1985
 Jarmo Rantanen 1985–2007
 Timo P. Nieminen (kok.) 2007–2012
 Anna-Kaisa Ikonen (kok.)	2013–2017
 Lauri Lyly (sd.) 2017–2021
 Anna-Kaisa Ikonen (kok.)	2021–present

Notable people

Born before 1900 

 Emil Aaltonen (1869—1949), industrialist and philanthropist
 Emanuel Aromaa (1873—1933), politician
 Eero Berg (1898–1969), long-distance runner and Olympic gold medalist
 Minna Canth (1844–1897), author and social activist
 Minna Craucher (1891–1932), socialite and spy
 James Finlayson (1772–1852), Scottish Quaker and industrialist
 Väinö Hakkila (1882–1958), politician
 Gustaf Idman (1885–1961), diplomat and a non-partisan Minister of Foreign Affairs
 Alma Jokinen (1882-1939), politician
 Feliks Kellosalmi (1877-1939), politician
 Augusta Laine (1867-1949), teacher of home economics and politician
 Frans Oskar Lilius (1871-1928), politician
 Wivi Lönn (1872–1966), architect
 Kaapo Murros (1875–1951), journalist, lawyer, writer and politician
 Juho Kusti Paasikivi (1870–1956), the Prime Minister of Finland and the 7th President of Finland
 Aaro Pajari (1897–1949), Major General and the Knight of the Mannerheim Cross
 Arvo Pohjannoro (1893–1963), Lutheran clergyman and politician
 Anders Rajala (1891–1957), wrestler
 Julius Saaristo (1891–1969) track and field athlete and Olympic gold medalist
 Matti Schreck (1897–1946), banker and film producer
 Frans Eemil Sillanpää (1888–1964), author and Nobel laureate
 Bertel Strömmer (1890–1962), architect
 Vilho Tuulos (1895–1967), triple jumper, long jumper and Olympic gold medalist
 August Wesley (1887–?), journalist, trade unionist and revolutionary

Born after 1900 

 Jonne Aaron (born 1983), singer
 Sinikka Antila (born 1960), lawyer and diplomat
 Aleksander Barkov (born 1995), Finnish-Russian professional ice hockey player
 Anu Bradford (born 1975), Finnish-American author and law professor
 Johanna Debreczeni (born 1980), singer
 Henrik Otto Donner (1939–2013), composer and music personality
 Anna Falchi (born 1972), Finnish-Italian model and film actress
 Mauri Favén (1920–2006), painter
 Jussi Halla-aho (born 1971), politician and former leader of the Finns Party
 Roope Hintz (born 1996), professional ice hockey player
 Anja Ignatius (1911–1995), violinist and music educator
 Seppo Jokinen (born 1949), author
 Viljo Kajava (1909–1998), author and poet
 Tapani Kalliomäki (born 1970), stage and film actor
 Glen Kamara (born 1995), professional footballer
 Jorma Karhunen (1913–2002), Finnish Air Force ace and the Knight of the Mannerheim Cross
 Leo Kinnunen (1943–2017), Formula One driver
 Urpo Lahtinen (1931–1994), journalist and magazine publisher, founder of Tamperelainen
 Kimmo Leinonen (born 1949), ice hockey executive and writer
 Mika Koivuniemi (born 1967), bowling coach and professional ten-pin bowler
 Kiira Korpi (born 1988), figure skater
 Patrik Laine (born 1998), professional ice hockey player
 Väinö Linna (1920–1992), author
 Jyrki Lumme (born 1966), professional hockey player
 Tiina Lymi (born 1971), actress, director, screenwriter and author
 Taru Mäkelä (born 1959), film director and screenwriter
 Eeva-Liisa Manner (1921–1995), poet, playwright and translator
 Sanna Marin (born 1985), politician, current leader of the Social Democratic Party and current Prime Minister of Finland
 Sakari Mattila (born 1989), professional footballer
 Matthau Mikojan (born 1982), rock musician, singer, guitarist and songwriter
 Pate Mustajärvi (born 1956), rock singer
 Mikko Nousiainen (born 1975), actor
 Teppo Numminen (born 1968), professional ice hockey player
 Luka Nurmi (born 2004), racing driver
 Erno Paasilinna (1935–2000), author and journalist
 Pekka Paavola (born 1933), politician and Minister of Justice
 Oiva Paloheimo (1910–1973), author, poet and aphorist
 Veijo Pasanen (1930–1988), actor
 Sakari Puisto (born 1976), politician
 Raisa Räisänen (1983–?), still missing 16-year-old girl, who was declared dead in absentia in 2007
 Matti Ranin (1926–2013), actor
 Leo Riuttu (1913–1989), actor
 Seela Sella (born 1936), actress
 Heikki Silvennoinen (born 1954), musician and actor
 Kikka Sirén (1964–2005), pop and schlager singer
 Jukka Tapanimäki (1961–2000), software developer and game programmer
 Armi Toivanen (born 1980), actress
 Jussi Välimäki (born 1974), rally driver
 Lauri Viita (1916–1965), poet
 Sofia Vikman (born 1983), politician
 Olavi Virta (1915–1972), singer
 Hans Wind (1919–1995), fighter pilot, flying ace and the Knight of the Mannerheim Cross
 Aki Yli-Salomäki (born 1972), composer, music critic and music journalist

International relations 

Tampere is twinned with:

 Chemnitz, Germany
 Essen, Germany
 Kaunas, Lithuania
 Kyiv, Ukraine
 Klaksvík, Faroe Islands
 Kópavogur, Iceland
 Linz, Austria
 Łódź, Poland (since 1996)
 Miskolc, Hungary
 Norrköping, Sweden
 Odense, Denmark
 Olomouc, Czech Republic
 Brașov, Romania
 Tartu, Estonia
 Trondheim, Norway (since 1946)
 Guangzhou, China
 Syracuse, United States

Tampere has two additional "friendship cities":

  León, Nicaragua
  Mwanza, Tanzania

See also 

 Battle of Tampere
 Mustamakkara
 Nokia, Finland
 Pirkkala
 Ratina Stadium
 Särkänniemi
 Tammerkoski
 Tampere Deck Arena
 Tampere Film Festival
 Tampere Tigers

Notes

References

Further reading

External links 

 
 Visit Tampere – The official Tampere Region visitor website
 Virtual City Guide: VirtualTampere.com
 Tampere – so much more than the sauna capital of the world – Visit Finland
 Megan Starr: 15 Quirky and Alternative Things to Do in Tampere, Finland. – Megan & Aram (Meganstarr.com), 1 December 2021.
 1952 Summer Olympics official report  pp. 62–3.
 Tammerkoski Heritage – Town's Industrial Heritage Portal
 CSSA Tampere Ry
 Lunch restaurants in Tampere
 
 

Tampere
Populated lakeshore places in Finland
Venues of the 1952 Summer Olympics
Cities and towns in Finland
Inland port cities and towns in Finland
Grand Duchy of Finland
Olympic football venues
Populated places established in 1779
1779 establishments in Europe
18th-century establishments in Finland